Hugh Barr Nisbet (24 August 1940 - 6 February 2021) was a British literary scholar and Emeritus Professor of Modern Languages (German) at the University of Cambridge. He was known for his works on German literature and philosophy and had worked as General Editor and Germanic Editor of the journal Modern Language Review.
Nisbet is a recipient of the Humboldt Prize for research on Lessing (1998).

References

1940 births
2021 deaths
Philosophy academics
Hegel scholars
21st-century British philosophers
Academics of the University of Cambridge
British literary critics
German–English translators
Kant scholars